Sułków  is a village in the administrative district of Gmina Wieliczka, within Wieliczka County, Lesser Poland Voivodeship, in southern Poland.

The village has a population of 1,000.

References

Villages in Wieliczka County